Ann Morfee, sometimes credited as "Anne Morphee", "Ann Morphy", or similar variants, is co-founder of Opus 20 and was a member of the Michael Nyman Band from 1992 to 2002.

She was educated at Chetham's School, Manchester, University of York and Guildhall School of Music and Drama.

She has worked with Richard NilesSimon HaleAudrey Riley, Cathy Giles, Colin Sheen, Graeme Perkins, Isobel Griffiths, John Wilson, Justin Pearson, London Metropolitan Orchestras Ltd, London Session Orchestra, London Telefilmonic Orchestra, Music Solutions Ltd and Roz Colls.

She has performed in pit orchestras for the shows Chitty Chitty Bang Bang, Evita, Joseph, Love Never Dies, Dirty Rotten Scoundrels, Top Hat, Kinky Boots (musical), Shrek,  Charlie and the Chocolate factory and The Producers.

External links
Official Site
"Anne" Morfee on IMDb

Year of birth missing (living people)
Living people
Alumni of the University of York
Alumni of the Guildhall School of Music and Drama
People educated at Chetham's School of Music